Black Buddafly is a German R&B duo composed of twin sisters Aminata "Amina" and Safietou "Jazz" Schmahl, who are of Senegalese and German descent.

Career 
The sisters were born in 1983 to a German mother and a Senegalese father. They were discovered in 2002, along with their older sibling, Sophie, by producer and manager Orrin Ennis, who signed the sisters to Germany's RCA as a trio under the name Choyce. In 2005, they signed to Def Jam, releasing the singles "Rock-a-Bye" and "Bad Girl" with the rapper Fabolous. Sophie departed the group in 2006 and Amina and Jazz continued the group as a duo.

Black Buddafly eventually disbanded and Amina pursued a solo career. In 2013, she garnered attention as a cast member on Love & Hip Hop: New York.

Discography

Mixtapes
 Worst Of.... Black Buddafly: 'The Forgotten MP3s (2011)

References

External links 
 Black Buddafly on Myspace

Contemporary R&B duos
German musical duos
German girl groups
German people of Senegalese descent
Senegalese people of German descent
Twin musical duos
Musical groups established in 2005
Participants in American reality television series
German twins
German contemporary R&B musical groups
Female musical duos
Female twins